Dingbian County is a county in the northwest of Shaanxi province, China, bordering the Ningxia Hui Autonomous Region to the west and Inner Mongolia to the north. It is the westernmost county-level division under the administration of Yulin City.

Administrative divisions
As of 2020, Dingbian County is divided to 1 subdistrict, 16 towns, and 2 townships.
Subdistricts
 

Towns

Townships
 
 

Climate

Transportation 
China National Highway 307
G20 Qingdao–Yinchuan Expressway
Taiyuan-Zhongwei-Yinchuan Railway; at Dingbian, the Dingbian-Yinchuan branch joins the main Taiyuan-Zhongwei line.

References

County-level divisions of Shaanxi
Yulin, Shaanxi